Damien Howson (born 13 August 1992) is an Australian cyclist, who rides for UCI ProTeam .

Career

Howson started his athletic career in basketball, becoming a state champion at age of 13. He moved to cycling when South Australian Sports Institute discovered his potential after physiological testing on the state junior basketball team.

He won the world under-23 time trial in 2013, as well as the Oceania Cycling Championships under-23 time trial and road race. He was named in the start list for the 2015 Vuelta a España and the 2016 Giro d'Italia. In 2017 he won the 64th edition of the Herald Sun Tour. In June 2017, he was named to make his debut at the 2017 Tour de France.

Personal life
In 2020 Howson married his high school friend, Georgie Russell at Longview Vineyard near Macclesfield in his home state of South Australia. He is an old scholar of Pedare Christian College.

Major results

2011
 Oceania Under-23 Road Championships
1st  Time trial
4th Road race
 1st  Team pursuit, National Track Championships
 4th Time trial, National Under-23 Road Championships
 9th Time trial, UCI Under-23 Road World Championships
 9th Chrono Champenois
 9th Memorial Davide Fardelli
2012
 1st  Time trial, Oceania Under-23 Road Championships
 2nd Time trial, National Under-23 Road Championships
 2nd Memorial Davide Fardelli
 3rd  Time trial, UCI Under-23 Road World Championships
 4th Chrono Champenois
 7th Overall Tour Alsace
2013
 1st  Time trial, UCI Under-23 Road World Championships
 1st UCI Oceania Tour
 Oceania Under-23 Road Championships
1st  Road race
1st  Time trial
 National Under-23 Road Championships
1st  Time trial
2nd Road race
 1st Trofeo Alcide Degasperi
 2nd Chrono Champenois
 3rd Overall Thüringen Rundfahrt der U23
1st Prologue
 3rd Trofeo Banca Popolare di Vicenza
 5th Giro del Belvedere
 7th Gran Premio Palio del Recioto
2014
 2nd  Team time trial, UCI Road World Championships
 3rd Time trial, National Road Championships
2015
 5th Time trial, National Road Championships
 5th Overall Herald Sun Tour
2016
 3rd Overall Herald Sun Tour
 4th Time trial, National Road Championships
2017
 1st  Overall Herald Sun Tour
1st Stage 1
 9th GP Miguel Induráin
 9th Pro Ötztaler 5500
2018
 3rd Overall Herald Sun Tour
 4th Overall Colorado Classic
2019
 1st Stage 1 (TTT) Tirreno–Adriatico
 2nd Overall Settimana Internazionale di Coppi e Bartali
1st Stage 1b (TTT)
 10th Overall Herald Sun Tour
2020
 1st  Overall Czech Cycling Tour
1st Stages 1 (TTT) & 4
 3rd Overall Herald Sun Tour
 3rd Overall Tour de Hongrie
2021
 1st  Overall Tour de Hongrie
1st Stage 4

Grand Tour general classification results timeline

References

External links

1992 births
Living people
Australian male cyclists
Cyclists from Adelaide
Australian Institute of Sport cyclists